The I. M. Sechenov Institute of Evolutionary Physiology and Biochemistry (IEPHB) is a facility in Saint Petersburg, Russia, dedicated to research in the fields of biochemistry and evolutionary physiology.

History 

The Institute was founded as a research group in October 1950 by Leon Orbeli, a physiologist and a longtime collaborator with Ivan Pavlov.  Initially, Orheli's research group included eight people. It subsequently expanded and transformed into the Laboratory of Evolutionary Physiology of the USSR Academy of Sciences, with the main object of studying functions of the nervous system in animals and man during ontogenesis, and also the effects of ionizing radiation on animals.

In 1956, the Laboratory became an Institute with Orbeli serving as the first Director of Evolutionary Physiology of the Academy of Sciences. The new Institute was named after Ivan Sechenov.  By the end of 1957, the Institute numbered 9 laboratories, one of them being transferred from the former P.F. Lesgaft Institute for Natural Sciences.

After Leon Orbeli's death in 1958, the Institute was headed by his collaborator Professor Alexander Ginetsinsky.  From June 1960 to March 1975, the Institute was guided by Eugenie Kreps: a former pupil of Ivan Pavlov and collaborator of Orbeli's, Kreps is known for his fundamental studies in the field of comparative physiology and biochemistry of the nervous system.  Kreps successfully promoted research in evolutionary biochemistry.  In response, in 1964, the Institute adopted its current name, I. M. Sechenov Institute of Evolutionary Physiology and Biochemistry.

In November 1969, a monument to Academician Orbeli was erected in front of the first laboratory block on Maurice Thorez Prospect.

From 1975 to 1981 Institute was headed by Vladimir Govyrin, and from 1981 to 2004 by Vladimir Svidersky.  Since 2004, the Institute has been headed by N. P. Vesselkin, Corresponding Member of RAS, a distinguished neuroscientist, and head of the Laboratory of Neuronal Interaction.

Journal of Evolutionary Biochemistry and Physiology 

The Institute is publisher of the Journal of Evolutionary Biochemistry and Physiology (ISSN 0022-0930) which is abstracted in the Chemical Abstracts. The journal is also available online by subscription only (online ISSN 1608-3202). Contents and abstracts are available online in PDF format.

See also 

 Evolutionary physiology

References

External links 
I. M. Sechenov Institute of Evolutionary Physiology and Biochemistry – official website in English

Research institutes established in 1950
Research institutes in Saint Petersburg
Research institutes in the Soviet Union
Biochemistry research institutes
1950 establishments in the Soviet Union
Institutes of the Russian Academy of Sciences